Salih Bademci (born 15 August 1984) is a Turkish actor.

Bademci is a graduate of Bornova Anadolu Lisesi. After appearing in a minor role in 1994, he made his main debut with Serdar Akar's movie Barda and then appeared in his first role on television with the hit period series Elveda Rumeli. His other period series are "Öyle Bir Geçer Zaman Ki", "Fatih", "Kulüp". In 2014, he was cast in Kanal D series Zeytin Tepesi as Akın, in the same year joined the cast of popular comedy crime series Ulan İstanbul, portraying the character of Ceyhun. In 2015, he was further noted by the audience with his role in Star TV romantic comedy series Kiralık Aşk, in which he played the character of Sinan Karakaya. He also had a leading role in İstanbullu Gelin, which was broadcast between 2017–2019.

Theatre 
 Big Shoot: Koffi Kwahulé - Tiyatrops - 2014–2015
 The Effect: Lucy Prebble - Siyah Beyaz ve Renkli - 2014–2015
 Oriental Dentist : Hagop Baronian - Istanbul City Theatre - 2011
 Fireface: Marius von Mayenburg - Siyah Beyaz ve Renkli - 2010
 The Miser: Molière - Kent Oyuncuları - 2009

Filmography

Awards

References

External links

Living people
1984 births
Turkish male television actors
Turkish male stage actors
Turkish male film actors
Bornova Anadolu Lisesi alumni
Actors from İzmir